Neuroleptic-induced deficit syndrome (NIDS) is a psychopathological syndrome that develops in some patients who take high doses of an antipsychotic for an extended time. It is most often caused by high-potency typical antipsychotics, but can also be caused by high doses of many atypicals, especially those closer in profile to typical ones (that have higher D2 dopamine receptor affinity and relatively low 5-HT2 serotonin receptor binding affinity), like paliperidone and amisulpride.

Symptoms 
Neuroleptic-induced deficit syndrome is principally characterized by the same symptoms that constitute the negative symptoms of schizophrenia: emotional blunting, apathy, hypobulia, anhedonia, indifference, difficulty or total inability in thinking, difficulty or total inability in concentrating, lack of initiative, attention deficits, and desocialization. This can easily lead to misdiagnosis and mistreatment. Instead of decreasing the antipsychotic, the doctor may increase their dose to try to "improve" what they perceive to be negative symptoms of schizophrenia, rather than antipsychotic side effects. The concept of neuroleptic-induced deficit syndrome was initially presented for schizophrenia, and it has rarely been associated in other mental disorders. In recent years, atypical neuroleptics are being more often managed to patients with bipolar disorder, so some studies about neuroleptic-induced deficit syndrome in bipolar disorder patients are now available.

There are significant difficulties in the differential diagnosis of primary negative symptoms and neuroleptic deficiency syndrome (secondary negative symptoms), as well as depression.

Case 
A Japanese man, who was being treated for schizophrenia, exhibited neuroleptics-induced deficit syndrome and obsessive–compulsive symptoms. His symptoms were remarkably improved by quitting a course of antipsychotics followed by the introduction of the antidepressant fluvoxamine. He had been misdiagnosed with schizophrenia, the real diagnosis was obsessive–compulsive disorder.

References 

Adverse effects of psychoactive drugs
Antipsychotics
Psychopathological syndromes